Just Good Ol' Boys is the first album by country music duo Moe Bandy and Joe Stampley, released in 1979 on the Columbia label recorded at the CBS Recording Studios, Nashville, Tennessee and Jack Clements Recording Studio, Tennessee.

Track listing
"Just Good Ol' Boys" (Ansley Fleetwood) - 2:38
"Make a Little Love Each Day" (Buck Moore) - 2:32
"Tell Ole I Ain't Here, He Better Get on Home" (Wayne Kemp) - 2:18
"Honky Tonk Man" (Johnny Horton, Tillman Franks, Howard Hausey) - 2:04
"Partners in Rhyme" (Bobby Fischer) - 2:36
"Holding the Bag" (Pat Bunch) - 2:34
"Bye Bye Love" (Boudleaux Bryant, Felice Bryant) - 2:27
"Only the Names Have Been Changed" (Harlan Howard, Doris Schaef) - 2:42
"When It Comes to Cowgirls (We Just Can't Say No)" (Jerry Abbott, Patty Jackson) - 2:10
"Thank Goodness It's Friday" (Ansley Fleetwood) - 2:24

Musicians
Bob Moore
Johnny Gimble
Chip Young
Tommy Allsup
Hargus "Pig" Robbins
Jimmy Capps
Leo Jackson
Weldon Myrick
Kenny Malone
Charlie McCoy
Billy Sanford
Hayward Bishop
Terry McMillan
Buddy Emmons
Phil Baugh

Backing
The Jordanaires with Laverna Moore.

Production
Sound engineers - Billy Sherrill & Ron Reynolds
Photography - Larry Dixon & Chip DeVilbiss
Design - Bill Johnson
Art direction - Virginia Team

References 

1979 debut albums
Moe Bandy albums
Joe Stampley albums
Columbia Records albums
Albums produced by Ray Baker (music producer)